Pervomaisk is a city in the Luhansk Oblast, Ukraine, on the left bank of the Luhan River. Since 2014, the city has been controlled by the pro-Russian self-proclaimed Luhansk People's Republic. Following the 2022 Russian invasion of Ukraine, the current population of Pervomaisk is unknown. Northeast of Pervomaisk, there is the static inverter plant of HVDC Volgograd-Donbass.  

After the 2022 annexation referendums in Russian-occupied Ukraine of September 2022, Russia declared that the city was now in their Lugansk People's Republic.

History

The history of Pervomaisk begins with the village of Aleksandrovka, which was founded in 1765. From the beginning of the 19th century, Pervomaisk was part of the Slavyanoserbsky district of the Yekaterinoslav province. In the second half of the 19th century, coal mining began in the settelement, and in 1872 the Petromaryevsky mine was opened and the Petro-Maryevsky Coal Industry Society created. In 1920, from the settlement of 'Petro-Maryevka' was created the town of 'Pervomaisk', literally translated as the 'First of May' in honour of International Workers' Day.  A local newspaper has been published in the city since 1930.

2014 on

Starting Mid-April 2014 pro-Russian separatists captured several towns in Luhansk Oblast; including Pervomaisk. The 2014 Donbass status referendums was not held in Pervomaisk, however the city remained under pro-Russian control. On 25 July 2014 Kyiv Post reported that heavy fighting for the town was imminent since the separatists had been chased by the Ukrainian army from nearby towns and intended to make Pervomaisk their "last stand with the military". Fighting for the control of the town between the separatists and the Ukrainian army indeed broke out on 28 July 2014. Throughout August, both sides would claim control of the city, and it was unclear exactly whose control Pervomaisk was under. However, by September it had become clear that Pervomaisk was under separatist control.    Dmytro Tymchuk confirmed that "armed clashes continue near Pervomaisk" on 15 August 2014.  From the end of July and 5 September 2014 there was heavy shelling by the Ukrainian army of residential areas of Pervomaisk, it was reported by Ukraine that the Luhansk People's Republic separatists had deliberately stationed their military units in residential areas.

The city attracted international attention in 2015 due mostly to the level of destruction. In early January 2015 the civilian population was estimated at between 10,000–20,000, and Russian human rights campaigner and the chairman of the Memorial Oleg Orlov reported on the destruction evident in the town and on the acute food shortage. The mayor, Yevgeny Ishchenko, was killed with three other people in January 2015. The subsequent report of the Memorial stated that the city was almost destroyed and almost no intact buildings were standing as a result of continuous attacks by the Ukrainian army. The population was not evacuated, and its situation was described as a catastrophe. According to a late September 2015 Russian Roulette Dispatch (by Vice News) at the time much of Pervomaisk was deprived of electricity and residents complained that only once a week they received water from water trucks.

Geography 

Between 2014 and 2022, the city was effectively a frontier settlement, with the frontlines near the city limits.

Demographics 
Ethnicity as of the Ukrainian Census of 2001:
 Ukrainians: 65.9%
 Russians: 27.3%
 Belarusians: 1.1%

Native language as of the 2001 census:
Russian: 71.2%
Ukrainian: 23.3%
Belarusian: 0.2%

References 

Cities in Luhansk Oblast
Yekaterinoslav Governorate
Cities of regional significance in Ukraine
Populated places established in the Russian Empire
City name changes in Ukraine
Soviet toponymy in Ukraine